is a Japanese former football player. He played for Japan national team.

Club career
Arima was born on August 22, 1917. After graduating from Tokyo Imperial University (currently University of Tokyo), he played for Sankyo Pharmaceuticals. He also played for University of Tokyo LB, which was composed of his alma mater University of Tokyo players and graduates. At University of Tokyo LB, he won the 1949 Emperor's Cup with Masao Ono and the rest of the team.

National team career
In March 1951, when Arima was 33 years old, he was selected for the Japan national team for Japan's first game after World War II in the 1951 Asian Games. At this competition, on March 7, he first played against Iran. He played three games for Japan in 1951.

National team statistics

Honours
Japan
Asian Games Bronze medal: 1951

References

External links
 
 Japan National Football Team Database

1917 births
Possibly living people
University of Tokyo alumni
Japanese footballers
Japan international footballers
Asian Games medalists in football
Asian Games bronze medalists for Japan
Footballers at the 1951 Asian Games
Medalists at the 1951 Asian Games
Association football midfielders
Daiichi Sankyo people